FIH Hockey World Cup may refer to:
 Men's FIH Hockey World Cup
 Women's FIH Hockey World Cup